Union Hill is a village in Kankakee County, Illinois, United States. The population was 58 at the 2010 census. It is included in the Kankakee-Bradley, Illinois Metropolitan Statistical Area.

Geography
Union Hill is located in western Kankakee County at  (41.107968, -88.147280).

Demographics

As of the census of 2000, there were 66 people, 28 households, and 19 families residing in the village. The racial makeup of the village was 98.48% White, and 1.52% from two or more races.

There were 28 households, out of which 35.7% had children under the age of 18 living with them, 60.7% were married couples living together, 7.1% had a female householder with no husband present, and 28.6% were non-families. 28.6% of all households were made up of individuals, and 7.1% had someone living alone who was 65 years of age or older. The average household size was 2.36 and the average family size was 2.90.

In the village, the population was spread out, with 21.2% under the age of 18, 6.1% from 18 to 24, 34.8% from 25 to 44, 30.3% from 45 to 64, and 7.6% who were 65 years of age or older. The median age was 37 years. For every 100 females, there were 88.6 males. For every 100 females age 18 and over, there were 92.6 males.

The median income for a household in the village was $28,125, and the median income for a family was $46,667. Males had a median income of $28,250 versus $14,583 for females. The per capita income for the village was $21,371. None of the population is below the poverty line.

References

Villages in Kankakee County, Illinois
Villages in Illinois